Sarath Chandrasiri Mayadunne is Sri Lankan civil servant and politician. He was the 36th Auditor General of Sri Lanka and was appointed to the Parliament of Sri Lanka in 2015.

Mayadunne attended Kegalu Vidyalaya. Graduating from University of Ceylon, Peradeniya with a Bachelor of Commerce in 1970, he became a Chartered Accountant. He is a Fellow of the Canadian Comprehensive Auditing Foundation.

Joining the Auditor-General's Department, he was appointed Auditor General on 13 August 2000, succeeding S. M. Sabry, and held the office until his retirement from public service on 23 October 2006. He was succeeded by P. A. Pematilaka.

He was listed by the Janatha Vimukthi Peramuna as a national list candidate at the 2015 general election. Following the election Mayadunne was appointed to Parliament as a national list Member of Parliament taking oaths on 1 September 2015, however he resigned two days later on 3 September 2015.

References

Members of the 15th Parliament of Sri Lanka
Auditors General of Sri Lanka
Sri Lankan accountants
Sinhalese politicians
Alumni of the University of Ceylon
Living people
Year of birth missing (living people)
Sinhalese civil servants